= Choiragria =

Town of ancient Thrace

Coordinates: 41°01′53″N 28°58′00″E

Choiragria (Greek: Χοιραγρία) was a town of ancient Thrace, inhabited during Roman times.

Its site is located south of the Meizon River in European Turkey.
